The ETAP 39s is a Belgian sailboat that was designed by Slovenian designers J&J Design, as a cruiser and first built in 1998.

Production
The design was built by ETAP Yachting in Belgium from 1998 to 2005, but it is now out of production.

Design
The ETAP 39s is a recreational keelboat, built predominantly of polyester glassfibre-foam cored sandwich, with wood trim. It has a 7/8 fractional sloop rig with aluminum spars, a deck-stepped mast, wire standing rigging and a single set of swept spreaders. The hull has a raked stem, a reverse transom, with boarding steps, an internally mounted spade-type rudder controlled by a wheel and a fixed fin keel or shoal draft keel, both with weighted bulbs. It displaces  and carries  of lead ballast.

The foam-cored construction renders the boat unsinkable.

The design has sleeping accommodation for eight people, with a double "V"-berth in the bow cabin, a "U"-shaped settee with a drop-down table that forms a double berth in the main cabin and two aft cabins with a double berth on each side. The galley is located amidships, on the port side. The galley is equipped with a stove, an ice box and a double sink. The head is located aft of the galley, on the port side, just forward of the companionway ladder and has a separate shower stall. The bow cabin is also equipped with a sink. A navigation station is opposite the head, on the starboard side.

Operational history
The boat was at one time supported by a class club, the ETAP Owners Association.

A 2001 review by Tim Murphy in Cruising World Magazine stated, "the two-cabin version we saw was comfortably laid out ... Boat of the Year judge Carol Hasse liked the aft head, which has a separate shower stall. However, it takes the spot near the companionway traditionally occupied by a U-shaped galley; the 39s's linear galley runs along the port side, an arrangement that none of our judges favored for cooking underway ... There were several details the BOTY judges didn't like. For example, the ports along the cabin top open outward ' onto the working deck. An extruded aluminum toerail, together with outward-angled stanchions, seemed a tripping hazard. Access to engine and through-hulls was tight. Under sail, she's a delight ... On the day we sailed her, she tracked along nicely, exhibiting no tendency to round up. Her balanced rudder felt light in our fingers."

In a 2001 review, naval architect Robert Perry wrote, "the Etap is built with what the brochure calls a "ship in ship" method, i.e., an outer hull and an inner hull with what the company describes as 'polyurethane foam with a minimum of 95-percent closed cells' injected between the two hulls. This increases the displacement of the structure to the point where the boat will not sink, even when holed. There are additional flotation cambers in the bow and the stern. I think what the company is telling us is that this is a liner-built boat with foam injected between the hull and the liner. While the term 'double skinned' may be factually accurate, it may also be misleading. The 'unsinkable' term makes me nervous. It's like tempting fate."

See also
List of sailing boat types

References

Keelboats
1990s sailboat type designs
Sailing yachts
Sailboat type designs by J&J Design
Sailboat types built by ETAP Yachting